Air Marshal Sir Reginald Herbert Embleton Emson  (11 January 1912 – 27 March 1995) was a senior commander in the Royal Air Force in the post-Second World War years.

RAF career
Emson joined the Royal Air Force in 1930. He became an Armament Officer in 1936 and served in the Second World War in the Technical Branch. After the war he became Assistant Chief of the Air Staff (Operational Requirements) and then Deputy Chief of the Air Staff from 1966 before becoming Inspector-General of the RAF in 1967, and retiring in 1969.

References

|-

|-

1912 births
1995 deaths
Companions of the Order of the Bath
Knights Commander of the Order of the British Empire
Recipients of the Air Force Cross (United Kingdom)
Royal Air Force air marshals
Royal Air Force personnel of World War II